The Columbus Day Storm of 1962 (also known as the Big Blow, and originally, and in Canada as Typhoon Freda) was a Pacific Northwest windstorm that struck the West Coast of Canada and the Pacific Northwest coast of the United States on October 12, 1962. Typhoon Freda was the twenty-eighth tropical depression, the twenty-third tropical storm, and the eighteenth typhoon of the 1962 Pacific typhoon season. Freda originated from a tropical disturbance over the Northwest Pacific on September 28. On October 3, the system strengthened into a tropical storm and was given the name Freda, before becoming a typhoon later that day, while moving northeastward. Freda maintained its intensity for another day, before beginning to gradually weaken, later on October 6. On October 9, Freda weakened into a tropical storm, before transitioning into an extratropical cyclone on the next day. On October 11, Freda turned eastward and accelerated across the North Pacific, before striking the Pacific Northwest on the next day. On October 13, the cyclone made landfall on Washington and Vancouver Island, and then curved northwestward. Afterward, the system moved into Canada and weakened, before being absorbed by another developing storm to the south on October 17. The Columbus Day Storm of 1962 is considered to be the benchmark of extratropical wind storms. The storm ranks among the most intense to strike the region since at least 1948, likely since the January 9, 1880 "Great Gale" and snowstorm. The storm is a contender for the title of the most powerful extratropical cyclone recorded in the U.S. in the 20th century; with respect to wind velocity, it is unmatched by the March 1993 "Storm of the Century" and the "1991 Halloween Nor'easter" ("The Perfect Storm"). The system brought strong winds to the Pacific Northwest and southwest Canada, and was linked to 46 fatalities in the northwest and Northern California resulting from heavy rains and mudslides.

Meteorological history

On the morning of September 28, a tropical disturbance formed south of the island of Eniwetok Atoll. Now named Freda, the system rapidly intensified as it proceeded northeastward over the open Pacific waters. On that afternoon, Freda intensified into a typhoon, with 1-minute sustained winds of 80 mph (130 km/h). After stabilizing to the north, Freda maintained its strength through the Pacific, before beginning to weaken slowly on October 6. Making a turn to the northeast, Freda maintained typhoon-status winds for several more days, before weakening into a tropical storm on October 9, as it started experiencing the effects of cold air.

The system became an extratropical cyclone as it moved into colder waters and interacted with the jet stream. However, post-season analysis concluded that the system continued weakening as it continued northeastward, crossing the 180th meridian later that afternoon, before completing the transition that evening.

The extratropical low redeveloped intensely off the coast of Northern California, due to favorable upper-level conditions, producing record rainfall across the San Francisco Bay Area that delayed some games in the 1962 World Series between the San Francisco Giants and the New York Yankees. The low moved northeastward, and then hooked straight north, as it neared southwest Oregon. There was little central pressure change until the cyclone passed the latitude of Astoria, Oregon, at which time the low began to degrade. On October 13, the center passed over Tatoosh Island, Washington, before making landfall on Vancouver Island, British Columbia, where it weakened rapidly. The cyclone then curved northwestward, before turning back eastward and moving into Canada. As the cyclone moved through Canada, another cyclone formed on its southern periphery, which absorbed the original cyclone by October 17.

Since the system was an extratropical cyclone, its wind field was neither as compact nor as strong as a tropical cyclone, though its wind field was significantly larger. The Astoria and Hoquiam records were broken by a major storm on December 12, 1995 (which measured  at Astoria); however, this event did not generate winds as intense as the Columbus Day Storm of 1962.

Wind speed highlights

The peak winds were felt as the storm passed close by on October 12.

Observations at the weather station resumed the next day.

About  to the north, at Portland, Oregon's major metropolitan area, measured wind gusts reached  at the Morrison Street Bridge in downtown Portland.

Many anemometers, official and unofficial, within the heavily stricken area of northwestern Oregon and southwest Washington were damaged or destroyed before winds attained maximum velocity.

This value, however, is higher than the maximum peak gust generated by any other Willamette Valley windstorm in the 1948–2010 period.

Damaging winds reached as far inland as Spokane.

Impact
At least 46 fatalities were attributed to this storm, more than for any other Pacific Northwest weather event. Injuries went into the hundreds. In terms of natural disaster-related fatalities for the 20th century, only Oregon's Heppner Flood of 1903 (247 deaths), Washington's Wellington avalanche of 1910 (96 deaths), the Great Fire of 1910 (87 deaths), and Eruption of Mount St. Helens of 1980 (57 deaths) caused more. For Pacific Northwest windstorms in the 20th century, the runner up was the infamous October 21, 1934, gale, which caused 22 fatalities, mostly in Washington.

In less than 12 hours, more than 11 billion board feet (26,000,000 m3) of timber was blown down in northern California, Oregon and Washington combined; some estimates put it at 15 billion board feet (35,000,000 m3). This exceeded the annual timber harvest for Oregon and Washington at the time. This value is above any blowdown measured for East Coast storms, including hurricanes; even the often-cited 1938 New England hurricane, which toppled 2.65 billion board feet (6,300,000 m3), falls short by nearly an order of magnitude.

Estimates put the dollar damage at approximately $230 million to $280 million for California, Oregon, and Washington combined. Those figures in 1962 US dollars translate to $1.8 to $2.2 billion in 2014 US dollars. Oregon's share exceeded $200 million in 1962 US dollars. This is comparable to land-falling hurricanes that occurred within the same time frame (for example, Audrey, Donna, and Carla from 1957 to 1961).

The Metropolitan Life Insurance Co. (now MetLife) named the Columbus Day Storm the nation's worst natural disaster of 1962.

California
In Central and Northern California, all-time record rains associated with the atmospheric river along the cold front caused major flooding and mudslides, particularly in the San Francisco Bay Area.

Heavy rain forced Game 6 of the 1962 World Series at San Francisco's Candlestick Park to be postponed from its originally scheduled date of October 11 to Monday, October 15.

Oregon

In the Willamette Valley, it is said the undamaged home was the exception. Livestock suffered greatly due to the barn failures: the animals were crushed under the weight of the collapsed structures, a story that was repeated many times throughout the afflicted region.

Radio and TV broadcasting were affected in the Portland area. KGW-TV lost its tower at Skyline and replaced the temporary tower with a new one on January 28, 1963. KOIN radio lost one of two AM towers at Sylvan. KPOJ-AM/-FM lost much of its transmitting equipment, plus one of two towers was left partially standing at Mount Scott. KPOJ-FM was so badly damaged it wouldn't return to the air until February 9, 1963. KWJJ-AM lost one of its towers and a portion of its transmitter building at Smith Lake. KISN-AM also lost a tower at Smith Lake. However, KATU didn't have a generator and power was cut off. The heavy-duty design of the radio towers on Portland's West Hills today, with extensive and robust guy cables, is a direct result of the lessons learned from the 1962 catastrophe.

For northwest Oregon, the entire power distribution system had to be rebuilt from the ground up. Some locations did not have power restored for several weeks. This storm became a lasting memory for local power distributors.  Indeed, a number of high wind related studies appeared in the years after the storm in an attempt to assess the return frequency of such potentially damaging winds.

The state capitol grounds at Salem, and the state's college campuses, resembled battlefields with heavy losses of trees.

The Campbell Hall tower at Oregon College of Education (now Western Oregon University) in Monmouth crashed to the ground, an event recorded by student photographer Wes Luchau in the most prominent picture-symbol of the storm.

East of Salem, the wind destroyed a historic barn that served as a clandestine meeting place by pro-slavery Democratic members of the state Legislature in 1860.

The Oregon State Beavers–Washington Huskies college football game went on as scheduled Saturday, October 13 in Portland, in a heavily damaged Multnomah Stadium. Much of the roof was damaged and seats damaged by falling debris were replaced by portable chairs. Crews cleared debris from the grandstand and playing field right up to kickoff. Most of the electricity, including the scoreboard and clock, was still out and players dressed by candlelight in the locker rooms. The Huskies came from behind to beat the Beavers 14–13, despite a strong performance by quarterback Terry Baker, who would win the Heisman Trophy later that year.

British Columbia
Five people in British Columbia were killed in the storm, and the area suffered $80 million in damages. Stanley Park lost 3,000 trees. A Victoria resident described it as "Just general devastation everywhere you went. There were trees breaking off and flying across the roads. "Wind was just blowing the rain horizontal and trees were weaving all over the place. You didn't know if you were going to get hit or not." At Victoria airport, a Martin Mars waterbomber ("Caroline Mars") was hurled  and irreparably damaged.

See also

 Hanukkah Eve windstorm of 2006
 Great Coastal Gale of 2007
 Great Olympic Blowdown of 1921
 October 2009 North American storm complex
 January 2010 North American winter storms
 January 2012 Pacific Northwest snowstorm
 October 2021 Northeast Pacific bomb cyclone

References

Further reading

External links

 Windstorms Brochure (PDF) from the National Weather Service Forecast Office in Portland, Oregon
 
 
 
 
 

1962 in Oregon
1962 meteorology
1962 natural disasters
Natural disasters in Oregon
Natural disasters in Washington (state)
Pacific Northwest storms
Natural disasters in British Columbia
1962 natural disasters in the United States
1962 disasters in Canada